Kevin Young may refer to:

Kevin Young (athlete) (born 1966), American athlete, former world record holder in the 400 metres hurdles
Kevin Young (baseball) (born 1969), American baseball player
Kevin Young (basketball, born 1981), American basketball coach
Kevin Young (basketball, born 1990), Puerto Rican-American basketball player
Kevin Young (footballer) (born 1961), English footballer
Kevin Young (ice hockey) (born 1982), Canadian professional ice hockey player
Kevin Young (poet) (born 1970), American poet
Kevin Young, singer of Disciple (band)